Jimmy Lennon Sr. (April 13, 1913 – April 20, 1992) was a ring announcer for boxing and professional wrestling matches.

Early life
Lennon sang as a young boy in church and later formed a singing group, The Lennon Brothers, with his brothers in Venice, California. He also served the World War II effort by becoming a commissioned civil instructor as a butcher and cook. At age 17, Lennon was planning to go to college and become an English professor, but his father Herbert Lennon became ill and died at age 44. This left Jimmy and his 19-year-old brother John Henry to work and support the large surviving family. He worked at multiple jobs singing and performing at sports events, athletic, patriotic, and police events in and around Los Angeles.

Announcing career
Lennon first became a ring announcer in Santa Monica, California at the Ocean Park Arena, while working there as the regular singer of "The Star-Spangled Banner". The regular ring announcer at the time was unavailable so the event coordinator asked Lennon if he would fill in as ring announcer. At the time Lennon was wearing a tuxedo, which he also wore for his first announcing job. His boss liked Lennon's performance so well, he hired Lennon as the regular fight announcer.

He was a stickler for details, a prime example being his painstaking effort to pronounce tongue-twisting names correctly. “A man is entitled to the dignity of his own name,” he once told the Los Angeles Times.

Other media
Lennon appeared in 75 productions, including Raging Bull, Rocky III, Main Event, California Split, Tough Guys, Kid Galahad, The Munsters, and The Monkees. Lennon was the character of a Jakks Pacific action figure released in 2007, depicting his Rocky III appearance. He was the uncle of the Lennon Sisters vocal group on The Lawrence Welk Show.

Personal life
After ten years of heart problems, Lennon was admitted to St. John's Hospital in Santa Monica, California, where he died in ER on April 20, 1992. Private funeral services were first attended by family and friends in Santa Monica, followed by a larger public open-casket service and burial. Lennon was survived by his wife, Doris, and four children: Scott, Robin Thomas, Kim Fitzgerald and Jimmy Jr., who is also a boxing ring announcer.

Championships and accomplishments
World Boxing Hall of Fame
Hall of Fame
Wrestling Observer Newsletter awards
Wrestling Observer Newsletter Hall of Fame (Class of 1997)

Selected filmography
Killer McCoy (1947) - Ring Announcer (uncredited)
State of the Union (1948) - Reporter (uncredited)
Fighting Fools (1949) - Ring Announcer (uncredited)
Alias the Champ (1949) - Ring Announcer
Fighting Coast Guard (1951) - Announcer (uncredited)
Iron Man (1951) - Announcer (uncredited)
Racket Girls (1951) - Himself
The Ring (1952) - Ring announcer Aragon fight (uncredited)
Champ for a Day (1953) - Fight Announcer (uncredited)
City of Bad Men (1953) - Fight Announcer (uncredited)
World in My Corner (1956) - Ring Announcer
Kid Galahad (1962) - Fight Announcer (uncredited)
Joe Frazier vs. Eddie Machen (1966) - Himself
Hammer (1972) - Announcer
Let's Do It Again (1975) - Fight Announcer
Train Ride to Hollywood (1975) - Himself
The One and Only (1978) - Ring Announcer in New York (uncredited)
Matilda (1978) - Ring announcer
Movie Movie (1978) - The Announcer (segment "Dynamite Hands")
The Main Event (1979) - Announcer
Raging Bull (1980) - Ring Announcer - Second Robinson Fight and Dauthuille Fight
Thomas Hearns vs. Pipino Cuevas (1980) - Himself
Body and Soul (1981) - Ring Announcer
Rocky III (1982) - Title Announcer 
Delta Pi (1984) - Ring Announcer 
Tough Guys (1986) - Himself

See also
Chuck Hull
Michael Buffer

References

Briefly, Ring Announcer Lennon Dies After Long Illness, Daily News of Los Angeles, April 21, 1992.
L.A. Ring Announcer Jimmy Lennon Dies; Boxing: He was the popular voice at Southland bouts for more than four decades Los Angeles Times, April 21, 1992.

External links
 

1913 births
1992 deaths
Professional wrestling announcers